Yermolovo is a rural locality (a village) in Kubenskoye Rural Settlement, Vologodsky District, Vologda Oblast, Russia. The population was 3 as of 2002.

Geography 
The distance to Vologda is 72 km, to Kubenskoye is 27 km. Yefimovo, Babik, Dolmatovo, Lavrentyevo, Krinki, Nikulino, Borisoglebskoye, Popovskoye, Mynchakovo, Vysokovo-1, Potrokhovo are the nearest rural localities.

References 

Rural localities in Vologodsky District